Kapoho, Hawaii, is a now-uninhabited unincorporated area in Puna district, Hawaii County, Hawaii, located near the eastern tip of the island of Hawaii, in the easternmost subaerial end of the graben overlying Kīlauea's east rift zone. Originally destroyed by an eruption of Kīlauea in 1960, it was rebuilt as a community of private homes and vacation rentals. In the eruption that began in May 2018, the town was largely destroyed by  lava by early June, and the bay filled in as the lava flow extended out into the ocean.

Eruption of January 1960
On January 12, 1960, residents of Kapoho experienced over 1,000 small earthquakes shaking the area. Deep cracks opened up in the street, and there are historic photos of residents inspecting the damage.

The eruption began on the night of the 13th, spilling lava out in the middle of a sugar cane field just above Kapoho. Although the main flow of lava flowed into the ocean, a slow-moving offshoot crept towards the town of Kapoho. Despite frantic efforts to divert the flow with earthen barricades or to harden it by spraying water on it, on January 28 the flow entered and buried the town. Nearly 100 homes and businesses as well as a hot spring resort were destroyed. The Cape Kumukahi Light east of the town was spared and continues in operation, but the keeper's dwellings were destroyed.

Kapoho until 2018

There was no lava activity in Kapoho for close to 60 years. The natural tide pools, black sand beach, and warm hot springs transformed Kapoho into an attractive spot to live and for tourists to visit.  Owing to these two factors, despite being in a very high-risk lava flow hazard zone, Kapoho became the most expensive area to live in Puna, with many homes costing over $1,000,000.

2018 lower Puna eruption

The 2018 lower Puna eruption interrupted electric power to Kapoho in late May and closed the main road to the rest of the island. On May 30 residents were urged to evacuate. On June 1, the lava flow front entered Kapoho on top of the 1960 flow and then took a turn to the south. On June 2, 2018, the Green Lake (Ka Wai o Pele) was destroyed when lava flows boiled it away and completely filled the entire basin. The flow entered the ocean at Kapoho Bay on June 4 on a half-mile-wide (800 m) front.

An unknown number of homes were destroyed by the lava on June 4, but the majority were still standing. By June 5, the lava flow had built a lava delta that extended nearly  into the bay. Hawai'i County officials indicated that hundreds of homes in the subdivisions of Vacationland Hawaii and Kapoho Beach Lots were destroyed by the rapidly advancing lava flow. Hawaii Island Mayor Harry Kim’s house, which he had purchased in 1971 as a second residence, was among the hundreds of houses destroyed.  Over the next few days, the entirety of the bay was filled in with lava, and on June 6, Hawaii County Civil Defense reported that the few homes remaining in Vacationland had been wiped out.
An adjacent subdivision, the gated Kapoho Beach Lots, also suffered lava inundation and was largely covered, along with the Kapoho tide pools, Kapoho Bay, and the nearby Champagne Ponds.

References

External links

The 1960 Kapoho Eruption of Kīlauea Volcano, Hawaii at the Hawaiian Volcano Observatory website

Ghost towns in Hawaii
History of Hawaii (island)
Populated places on Hawaii (island)
Kīlauea